Wān Mae Aw, is a village in Langkho Township, Langkho District, southern Shan State.

Geography
Wān Mae Aw lies by the Nam Na-mon River in a mountainous area, 4 km to the east of Loi Lan mountain and 5 km west from Wān Na-mon, a small town near the border with Mae Hong Son Province of Thailand.

Further reading
 Map - Districts of Shan (South) State

References

Populated places in Shan State
Myanmar–Thailand border